Piotr Wysocki (10 September 1797 in Warka – 6 January 1875 there), was a Polish captain and leader of the Polish conspiracy against Russian Tsar Nicolas I. He was a nobleman (szlachcic) who bore the Odrowąż coat of arms. On 29 November 1830, he raised military insurgents, starting the November Uprising against Russia. In 1831 he was sentenced to death by Russians, but his sentence was commuted to a 20 years exile in Siberia.

On 3 March 1831 he was awarded the Gold Cross of the Virtuti Militari.

References

1797 births
1875 deaths
People from Grójec County
Clan of Odrowąż
November Uprising participants
Polish exiles in the Russian Empire
Recipients of the Gold Cross of the Virtuti Militari